The 2016–17 Stony Brook Seawolves men's basketball team represented Stony Brook University in the 2016–17 NCAA Division I men's basketball season. The Seawolves were led by first-year head coach Jeff Boals and played their home games at Island Federal Credit Union Arena in Stony Brook, New York as members of the America East Conference. They finished the season 18–14, 12–4 in America East play to finish in second place. As the No. 2 seed in the America East tournament, they defeated Binghamton before losing to Albany in the semifinals. They were invited to the College Basketball Invitational where they lost in the first round to UIC.

Previous season
The Seawolves finished the 2015–16  season 26–7, 14–2 in America East play to win the regular season championship. They defeated UMBC, Hartford, and Vermont to win the America East tournament. As a result, they earned the conference's automatic bid go the NCAA tournament, the first in school history. As a No. 13 seed, the Seawolves fell to Kentucky in the first round.

On March 20, 2016, it was announced that head coach Steve Pikiell would leave the school to accept the job as the new head coach for Rutgers. He finished at Stony Brook with an eleven-year record of 192–157. On April 8, the school announced they had hired Jeff Boals as head coach.

Offseason

Departures

Incoming transfers

2016 recruiting class

2017 recruiting class

Preseason 
Stony Brook was picked to finish seventh in the preseason America East poll.

Roster

Schedule and results

|-
!colspan=9 style=; color:white;"| Exhibition

|-
!colspan=9 style=| Non-conference regular season

|-
!colspan=9 style=| America East regular season

|-
!colspan=9 style=| America East tournament

|-
!colspan=9 style=| CBI

References

Stony Brook Seawolves men's basketball seasons
Stony Brook
Stony Brook
Stony Brook Seawolves men's b
Stony Brook Seawolves men's b